Christopher Gordon Townsend (born 30 March 1966 in Abertillery) is a Welsh former professional footballer who played in the Football League, as a forward.

References

Sources
Profile at Neil Brown

1966 births
Living people
Sportspeople from Abertillery
Welsh footballers
Association football forwards
Cardiff City F.C. players
Forest Green Rovers F.C. players
Cheltenham Town F.C. players
Yeovil Town F.C. players
Gloucester City A.F.C. players
Dorchester Town F.C. players
Bath City F.C. players
Newport County A.F.C. players
Chesham United F.C. players
Ton Pentre F.C. players
Barry Town United F.C. players
English Football League players
Inter Cardiff F.C. players